Connecticut's 103rd House of Representatives district elects one member of the Connecticut House of Representatives. It encompasses parts of Cheshire, Southington, and Wallingford. It has been represented by Democrat Liz Linehan since 2017.

Recent elections

2020

2018

2016

2014

2012

References

103